Stephen Lambert (born 22 March 1959) is an English television producer and executive who works in Britain and America. He launched the TV formats Wife Swap, Faking It, The Secret Millionaire, Undercover Boss and Gogglebox.

He is the chief executive of Studio Lambert, one of All3Media's production companies. He is also chairman of Seven Stories, a scripted production company launched in 2015 and backed by All3Media.

His programmes have won dozens of awards including BAFTA awards, the Rose D'Or of Montreux and both Primetime and International Emmys.

In 2016 he was made a fellow of the Royal Television Society.

Education
Born in London, Lambert was educated at Thames Valley Grammar School and the University of East Anglia graduating with a first in Politics and Philosophy. He studied as a post-graduate student at Nuffield College, Oxford where he wrote a book on the history of British broadcasting policy published by the British Film Institute called Channel 4: Television with a Difference? which coincided with the launch of Britain's fourth terrestrial channel in November 1982.

BBC
In 1983, he joined the BBC and worked in the Documentaries Department for the next fifteen years. He was a producer and director of documentaries for the BAFTA-winning BBC2 series 40 Minutes and the BBC1 series Inside Story; many set in conflict areas such as Sri Lanka, Croatia, South Africa, Kuwait, Gaza and Northern Ireland. Between 1992 and 1994, he produced and directed a six-part documentary series for BBC2 about the Foreign and Commonwealth Office which was filmed in Northern Iraq, the former Soviet Union, Bosnia, Thailand, Saudi Arabia, Europe, the US and in Whitehall.

In 1994, Lambert became the founding editor of BBC2's main documentary strand of the 1990s, Modern Times. While running Modern Times, he executive produced some of the first BBC1 docu-soaps, including The Clampers and Lakesiders, as well as the fly-on-the-wall series about Sunderland A.F.C., Premier Passions and the five part Royal Television Society award-winning series about the Department of Social Security called The System. Lambert also started a long working relationship with the film-maker Adam Curtis, executive producing his series The Mayfair Set, winner of the 2000 BAFTA award for best factual series.

RDF Media
In 1998, Lambert left the BBC to join independent production company RDF Media as its first director of programs. He devised and executive produced the acclaimed series Faking It which premiered on Channel 4 in 2000. It won the BAFTA best features program award in 2001 and 2002 and the Rose d'Or in 2003. This was followed by Wife Swap, which attracted audiences of more than six million. It won the BAFTA best features program award in 2003 and the Rose D'Or in 2004. Lambert continued working with Adam Curtis, executive producing his The Century of the Self (2002), The Power of Nightmares (2004) (winner of BAFTA best factual series award 2004), and The Trap (2007).

From 1998 to 2005, RDF Media grew rapidly with Lambert spearheading its editorial development. RDF started producing in the US and opened its RDF USA production office in Los Angeles. In 2004, Lambert executive produced the US network version of Wife Swap which launched on ABC. RDF received Broadcasts Best Production Company of the Year Award for 2002, 2004 and 2006; the only company to win this award three times. In May 2005, RDF Media floated on the London Stock Exchange's Alternative Investment Market and started to acquire other independent production companies. Lambert became the group's chief creative officer. He continued to devise new formats such as The Secret Millionaire, which won the Rose d'Or in 2007, Shipwrecked: Battle of the Islands for Channel 4, and The Verdict for BBC2.

In 2007 Lambert resigned from RDF after taking responsibility over a misleadingly edited trailer for a BBC documentary which appeared to show the Queen storming out of a photoshoot with Annie Leibovitz. In fact, she was walking in. Peter Fincham, Controller of BBC One, and his head of publicity also resigned from their jobs.

Studio Lambert
In 2008, Lambert launched a new independent production company, Studio Lambert, based in London and Los Angeles. In the 2021 Broadcast survey of independent UK production companies, Studio Lambert ranked #5 by size of turnover.

Lambert's first major formatted show in his new company was Undercover Boss, which started on Britain's Channel 4 in 2009 and has been produced in dozens of countries around the world.  Studio Lambert produces an American version which premiered on CBS in February 2010 immediately after the Super Bowl to a record-breaking audience of nearly 40 million viewers. It went on to become the highest rating new show of the 2009-10 television season with an average audience of 17 million viewers and to earn an Emmy Awards nomination for Outstanding Reality Program every year from 2010 to 2016, winning the category in 2012 and 2013.

In March 2013, Studio Lambert launched Gogglebox on Channel 4, a weekly show observing ordinary people watching and reviewing the week's television. It has become "one of Britain's most popular shows", winning many awards including a BAFTA and five National Television Awards and local versions are produced in more than thirty countries. 

Lambert launched a scripted division in his company in 2015.  The first scripted show, Three Girls, won five BAFTA awards. This was followed by The Feed for Amazon Prime, and The Nest and Three Families for BBC One.

In 2021, Disney+ announced that Seven Stories, the other scripted company Lambert is involved in as chairman, was making Nautilus a major live-action series based on Jules Verne’s 20,000 Leagues Under the Sea.

Personal life
Lambert is married to journalist Jenni Russell and they have two children.

References

External links
 Studio Lambert website
 Lambert, Stephen (1982) Channel 4: Television with a Difference? 

1959 births
Living people
Alumni of the University of East Anglia
Alumni of Nuffield College, Oxford
British media executives
English television producers
Fellows of the Royal Television Society